A by-election was held in the Gagaifomauga no.1 constituency in Samoa on 15 August 2014.

The Gagaʻifomauga no.1 seat in the Legislative Assembly had been held by Aniteleʻa Tuiloʻa for the Human Rights Protection Party in the 2011 general election; he had first won it in 2006. During the 15th Parliament, he served as an associate minister in  the Ministry for Women, Community and Social Development. He died of kidney failure on 9 June 2014.

Despite it being a single seat constituency, the ruling Human Rights Protection Party, as often, nominated several candidates - in this instance, four: Gaina Tino (a former Minister for Justice), Faimalotoa Kolotita Stowers (former Director and CEO of the Samoa Broadcasting Service), Lavea Ieti, and Taito Vaea Tanu. This despite having nominated only one candidate in the constituency in the 2011 general election. The  opposition Tautua Samoa Party chose a single candidate: Lavea Peseta Lua Nafoi.

Results
Kolotita Stowers, the only woman among the five candidates, was elected - bringing to three the number of women in the 15th Samoan Parliament. The Tautua Samoa Party candidate finished last.

2011 results

References

By-elections to the Legislative Assembly of Samoa
2014 elections in Oceania
2014 in Samoa